

See also
 Lumpenproletariat